John Peter Sim,  (21 June 1917 – 29 July 2015) was an Australian politician. Born in Colac, Victoria, he was a farmer in Western Australia before serving in the military 1941–1946. He was Vice-President of the Western Australian Liberal Party 1960–1962. On 26 November 1964, he was appointed to the Australian Senate as a Liberal Senator for Western Australia, filling the casual vacancy caused by the death of Senator Seddon Vincent. The Australian Constitution dictated that a special Senate election had to be held at the same time as the lower house 1966 election, but Sim was re-elected. He held the seat until his retirement in 1980. Sim was appointed a Commander of the Order of the British Empire (CBE) on 31 December 1982, for service to parliament.

Sim died on 29 July 2015, aged 98.

References

1917 births
2015 deaths
Liberal Party of Australia members of the Parliament of Australia
Members of the Australian Senate for Western Australia
Members of the Australian Senate
Australian Commanders of the Order of the British Empire
20th-century Australian politicians
Australian Army personnel of World War II
Australian Army officers